Family income is generally considered a primary measure of a nation's financial prosperity.

In the United States, political parties perennially disagree over which economic policies are more likely to increase family income. The party in power often takes the credit (or blame) for any significant changes in family income.

See also
Median household income
Personal income

Household income